Samir Alakbarov (born 8 October 1968, Baku) is retired football striker from Azerbaijan.

International goals

Honours

Individual
Azerbaijani Footballer of the Year (3): 1991, 1992, 1993
Azerbaijan Premier League Top Scorer (1): 1993

References

1968 births
Living people
Soviet footballers
Azerbaijani footballers
Azerbaijani expatriate footballers
Azerbaijan international footballers
Azerbaijani football managers
Maccabi Petah Tikva F.C. players
Shamakhi FK players
Azerbaijani expatriate sportspeople in Israel
Expatriate footballers in Israel
Azerbaijan Premier League players
Liga Leumit players
Association football forwards
Neftçi PFK players
Soviet Top League players